Slavery in Massachusetts is an 1854 essay by Henry David Thoreau based on a speech he gave at an anti-slavery rally at Framingham, Massachusetts, on July 4, 1854, after the re-enslavement in Boston, Massachusetts of fugitive slave Anthony Burns.

See also 
 Civil Disobedience by Thoreau

On-line sources 
 Slavery in Massachusetts at Wikisource
 
 Slavery in Massachusetts at The Picket Line
 Slavery in Massachusetts at eserver.org (annotated)

Book sources 
 My Thoughts are Murder to the State by Henry David Thoreau
 The Higher Law: Thoreau on Civil Disobedience and Reform
 Collected Essays and Poems by Henry David Thoreau

External links 
 
 Thoreau’s Stance on Abolition

Essays by Henry David Thoreau
1854 essays
African-American history of Massachusetts